Roma Tuscolana railway station is a major station serving the city and comune of Rome, Italy.  It forms part of the Pisa–Livorno–Rome railway and the Rome–Fiumicino railway.

The station is currently managed by Rete Ferroviaria Italiana (RFI).  Train services are operated by Trenitalia.  Each of these companies is a subsidiary of Ferrovie dello Stato (FS), Italy's state-owned rail company.

Location
Roma Tuscolana railway station is situated at Piazza della stazione Tuscolana, just to the southeast of the city centre, in the quartiere (English: district) of Tuscolano.

Passenger and train movements

Ferrovie regionali del Lazio FR3 and FR5 commuter lines pass through the station.

Interchanges 
  Ponte Lungo station on Line A on the Rome Metro.
  16 – 85 – 412 – 590 – 665 – 671 – nMA
   Regional trains of Lazio Regional Railways
   Regional train to Rome Fiumicino Airport

See also

History of rail transport in Italy
List of railway stations in Lazio
Rail transport in Italy
Railway stations in Italy

References

External links

History and pictures of Roma Tuscolana railway station 

Railway stations in Rome